Events from the year 1279 in Ireland.

Incumbent
Lord: Edward I

Events
Duarcán mac Íomhaor Mág Tighearnán the Second (anglicised Durcan McKiernan) became chief of the McKiernan Clan and Baron or Lord of Tullyhunco barony, County Cavan

Births

Deaths